Alejandro Luis Madrid-González (born August 25, 1968) is an American music scholar, cultural theorist, and professor, whose research focuses on Latino and Latin American musics and sound practices. He is professor of musicology and ethnomusicology at Harvard University.

Biography 
Madrid received a B.M. in guitar performance from The Boston Conservatory, an M.F.A. in music performance from SUNY Purchase, an M.M. in musicology from University of North Texas, and a Ph.D. in musicology with a minor in comparative cultural studies from the Ohio State University.

Madrid is a recipient of a Guggenheim Fellowship, the Dent Medal given by the Royal Musical Association and the International Musicological Society, the 2016 Humanities Book Award from the Latin American Studies Association-Mexico Section, the 2018 Philip Brett Award from the American Musicological Society (AMS), the Robert M. Stevenson Award from the AMS, in 2016 and 2014, the 2012 Ruth A. Solie Award from the AMS, the 2010 Woody Guthrie Book Award from the International Association for the Study of Popular Music-US Branch, and the 2005 Casa de las Américas Prize for Latin American Musicology

He has been invited to deliver national and international keynote addresses and lectureships, including the Bruno and Wanda Nettl Distinguished Lecture in Ethnomusicology at the University of Illinois at Urbana-Champaign.

Awards and honors

Bibliography

Books 
 Los sonidos de la nación moderna. Música, cultura e ideas en el México posrevolucionario, 1920-1930 (2008) ; English translation: Sounds of the Modern Nation. Music, Culture, and Ideas in Post-Revolutionary Mexico (2009) 
 Nor-Tec Rifa! Electronic Dance Music from Tijuana to the World (2008) 
 Music in Mexico (2012) 
 Danzón. Circum-Caribbean Dialogues in Music and Dance (co-authored with Robin D. Moore, 2013) 
 In Search of Julián Carrillo and Sonido 13 (2015) 
 Tania León's Stride. A Polyrhythmic Life (2021)

Edited volumes 
 Postnational Musical Identities. Cultural Production, Distribution, and Consumption in a Globalized Scenario (2007, co-edited with Ignacio Corona) 
 Transnational Encounters. Music and Performance at the U.S.-Mexico Border (2011) 
 Experimentalisms in Practice. Music Perspectives from Latin America (2018, co-edited with Ana Alonso-Minutti and Eduardo Herrera)

Essays and other short works 
 “Rastreando las huellas de la escucha performativa: la escritura como constelación archivística.” Anuario Musical, No. 76 (2021): 11-30.
 “Entre/tejiendo vidas y discursos: notas y reflexiones en torno a la biografía y la anti-biografía musical.” Revista Argentina de Musicología, Vol. 22, No. 1 (2021): 19-43.
 “Secreto a voces: Excess, Vocality, and Jotería in the Performance of Juan Gabriel.” GLQ: A Journal of Lesbian and Gay Studies, Vol. 24, No. 1 (2018): 85–111.
 “Diversity, Tokenism, Non-Canonical Musics, and the Crisis of the Humanities in U.S. Academia." Journal of Music History Pedagogy, Vol. 7, No. 2 (2017): 124–129. 
 Madrid, Alejandro L. and Robin D. Moore, “Cuestiones de género: el danzón como un complejo de performance." Boletín Música, No. 42 (2016): 3-55.
 “Landscapes and Gimmicks from the 'Sounded City': Listening for the Nation at the Sound Archive." Sound Studies. An Interdisciplinary Journal, Vol. II, No. 2 (2016): 119–136.
 “Más que ‘tontas canciones de amor’: Sentimentalismo cosmopolita en la balada romántica de México en los 1970s y 1980s,” in Canção romantica. Intimidade, mediação e identidade na América Latina, ed. by Martha Ulhoa and Simone Luci Pereira, 47-69. Rio de Janeiro: Folio Digital, 2016.
 “Renovation, Rupture, and Restoration: The Modernist Musical Experience in Latin America,” in The Modernist World, ed. by Stephen Ross and Allana C. Lindgren, 409–416. New York and London: Routledge, 2015.
 “Rigo Tovar, Cumbia, and the Transnational Grupero Boom,” in Cumbia!: Scenes of a Migrant Latin American Music Genre, ed. by Héctor Fernández L’Hoeste and Pablo Vila, 105–118. Durham, NC: Duke University Press, 2013.
 “Cantar la negritud: capeyuye e identidad mascoga en la frontera México-Estados Unidos." Boletín Música, No. 32 (2012): 3-22. 
 “Music, Media Spectacle, and the Idea of Democracy. The Case of DJ Kermit’s ‘Gober,’” in Media, Sound, and Culture in Latin America and the Caribbean, ed. by Alejandra Bronfman and Andrew G. Wood, 71-84. Pittsburgh: University of Pittsburgh Press, 2012.
 “American Music in Times of Postnationality.” Journal of the American Musicological Society, Vol. 63, No. 3 (2011): 699–703.
 “Música y nacionalismos en Latinoamérica,” in A tres bandas. Mestizaje, sincretismo e hibridación en el espacio sonoro iberoamericano (s. XVI-s. XX), ed. by Albert Recasens and Christian Spencer Espinoza, 227–235. Madrid: SEACEX, 2010.
 “The Sounds of the Nation: Visions of Modernity and Tradition in Mexico’s First National Congress of Music.” Hispanic American Historical Review, Vol. 86, No. 4 (2006): 681–706.
 "Dancing with Desire. Cultural Embodiment and Negotiation in Tijuana's Nor-Tec Music and Dance." Popular Music, Vol. 25, No. 3 (2006): 383–399.
 “Imagining Modernity, Revising Tradition. Nor-tec Music in Tijuana and Other Borders.” Popular Music and Society, Vol. 28, No. 5 (2005): 595–618.
 “Navigating Ideologies in ‘In-Between’ Cultures. Signifying Practices in Nor-tec Music.” Latin American Music Review, Vol. 24, No. 2 (2003): 270-286.
 “Transculturación, performatividad e identidad en la Sinfonía No. 1 de Julián Carrillo.” Resonancias, No. 12 (2003): 61–86.

References 

1968 births
Living people
State University of New York at Purchase alumni
Boston Conservatory at Berklee alumni
University of North Texas alumni
Ohio State University alumni
Cornell University faculty
Music historians
Ethnomusicologists
20th-century American musicologists
20th-century American writers
21st-century American musicologists
Mexican American
American academics of Mexican descent